Patricia A. Mcdonald (born 1943) is a Republican politician who was elected and currently serves in the Vermont House of Representatives. She represents the Washington-3-3 Representative District.

References

1943 births
Living people
Republican Party members of the Vermont House of Representatives
Women state legislators in Vermont
Place of birth missing (living people)
21st-century American women